Carbonic anhydrase II (gene name CA2), is one of sixteen forms of human α carbonic anhydrases. Carbonic anhydrase catalyzes reversible hydration of carbon dioxide.  Defects in this enzyme are associated with osteopetrosis and renal tubular acidosis. 
Renal carbonic anhydrase allows the reabsorption of bicarbonate ions in the proximal tubule.
 Loss of carbonic anhydrase activity in bones impairs the ability of osteoclasts to promote bone resorption, leading to osteopetrosis.

Interactions
Carbonic anhydrase II has been shown to interact with band 3 and sodium-hydrogen antiporter 1.

References

Further reading